Mordellistena scapularis is a species of beetle in the genus Mordellistena of the family Mordellidae. It was described by Say in 1824.

References

Beetles described in 1824
scapularis